The Parodontidae are a family of fresh water fish of the order Characiformes. The three genera include about 32 species, though several are undescribed. These fish are generally benthic and live in mountain streams of eastern Panama and South America. It was formerly considered a subfamily of the family Hemiodontidae.

See also
Characiformes

References

 
Ray-finned fish families